The flag football competition at the 2022 World Games took place in July 2022, in Birmingham, Alabama in the United States.

Originally scheduled to take place in July 2021, the Games were rescheduled for July 2022 as a result of the 2020 Summer Olympics postponement due to the COVID-19 pandemic. Flag football competition made its debut as invitational sport of The World Games programme and featured eight men's teams and eight women's teams from around the world who competed at Legion Field.

Overview
On July 20, 2020, the International World Games Association (IWGA), National Football League (NFL), and International Federation of American Football (IFAF) announced that flag football would join the existing lineup of 32 unique, multi-disciplinary sports for the 2022 World Games in Birmingham, Alabama.

The 2022 World Games, which marked the 40th anniversary of the event, took place from July 7–17, 2022. Hosted at Birmingham's historic Legion Field, flag football featured eight men's teams and eight women's teams from around the world.

As current reigning world champions (and host nation), the United States men's and women's teams both pre-qualified for the 2022 World Games. The remaining seven teams were selected through the IFAF qualifying process.

Qualification

Participating nations

Men's tournament

Women's tournament

Medal table

Medalists

Men's tournament

Pool A

Pool B

Knock-out round

Women's tournament

Pool A

Pool B

Knock-out round

References

External links
 The World Games 2022
 International Federation of American Football
 Results book

 
2022 World Games